The Mixed team relay of the 2019 UCI Road World Championships was a cycling event that took place on 22 September 2019 in Harrogate, England. It was the first time the event had been held, as it replaced the men's and women's team time trial from previous editions.

The course consisted of two laps of a  circuit through the town of Harrogate in North Yorkshire. The three men started first and passed the baton to three women after one lap. The time was taken from the second rider to finish from each team.

Results

References

Mixed team relay
UCI Road World Championships – Mixed team relay
2019 in road cycling